Aitken Nunatak is a small rock nunatak,  high, standing  southwest of Mount Bumstead in the Grosvenor Mountains in Antarctica. Named by Advisory Committee on Antarctic Names for William M. Aitken, United States Antarctic Research Program aurora scientist at South Pole Station, 1962.

References

Nunataks of the Ross Dependency
Dufek Coast